Austroclavus is a genus of sea snails, marine gastropod mollusks, unassigned to a family within the superfamily Conoidea.

Species
Species within the genus Austroclavus include:
 † Austroclavus awakinoensis Powell, 1942 
 † Austroclavus clifdenensis Powell, 1942 
 † Austroclavus famelicus (Marwick, 1931) 
 † Austroclavus finlayi Powell, 1942 
 † Austroclavus kaipara (Laws, 1939) 
 † Austroclavus marshalli Powell, 1942 
 † Austroclavus nitens (P. Marshall, 1918) 
 † Austroclavus nodulatus Laws, 1948 
 † Austroclavus tenuispiralis (P. Marshall, 1918) 
 Austroclavus undatus (Hedley, 1907)
Species brought into synonymy
 Austroclavus aeneus (Hedley, 1922): synonym of Antiguraleus aeneus (Hedley, 1922)
 Austroclavus exasperatus (Reeve, 1843): synonym of Clavus exasperatus (Reeve, 1843)

References

External links
 Powell, A. W. B. (1942). The New Zealand Recent and fossil Mollusca of the family Turridae with general notes on turrid nomenclature and systematics. Bulletin of the Auckland Institute and Museum. 2: 1-188, 14 pls